Oenochroma privata is a moth of the family Geometridae first described by Francis Walker in 1860. It is known from Australia.

References

Oenochrominae
Moths described in 1860